"More Than Physical" is a song by English girl group Bananarama from their third studio album, True Confessions (1986). It was released on 11 August 1986 as the album's third single. It was co-written and produced by the Stock Aitken Waterman (SAW) trio. A reworked version of the song was released as the single version.

In order to capitalize on the number-one success of previous single "Venus" (the other True Confessions track produced by SAW), "More Than Physical" was given a hi-NRG-influenced makeover with a sound similar to their previous dance-oriented chart-topper.

"More Than Physical" marked the beginning of Bananarama's successful songwriting relationship with Stock Aitken Waterman. Speaking of the sometimes-fractious dynamic in the studio, producer Mike Stock said he found it difficult to write with the band, explaining he was obliged to collaborate with them due to a deal with their management.

“It’s very difficult to be creative if someone’s just going to mock you, or laugh at you,” he said. “With Bananarama it was just awkward, all the time very awkward, and I didn’t feel comfortable writing with them.”

Despite heavy exposure on MTV, "More Than Physical" did not duplicate the success of "Venus", reaching number 41 on the UK Singles Chart and number 73 on the US Billboard Hot 100. Elsewhere, it peaked at number 25 in Ireland, number 28 in Australia, and number 38 in Germany. In the United States, "More Than Physical" reached number five on the US Hot Dance Club Play chart.

"More Than Physical" was featured prominently in the 1987 British film Rita, Sue and Bob Too starring Michelle Holmes and Siobhan Finneran. The song is featured in the scene where the girls are babysitting for Bob and Michelle, and they dance around the living room while the video to "More Than Physical" plays on the television.

Music video
The remixed single version's music video, directed by Peter Care, further developed Bananarama's new glamorous and sexy style. The video included shots of several topless, muscled men intercut with footage of the group members. Some shots used coloured filters, and are juxtaposed with tightly cropped shots of body parts or movements in slow motion. One of the models in the video is Keren Woodward's then-boyfriend, David-Scott Evans.

Track listings
UK, US, Canadian and Australian 7-inch single
"More Than Physical" 3:18 
"Scarlett"  4:11

2nd UK 7-inch single doublepack
"More Than Physical" – 3:18
"Scarlett" – 4:11
"Venus" – 3:38
"White Train" – 3:50

UK 7-inch picture disc
"More Than Physical" (Worldwide Single Version) – 3:20
"Venus" (Original Version) – 3:38
"Scarlett" – 4:11

The Original Version of "Venus" is a differently mixed version from the standard 7″ version.

UK 12-inch single
"More Than Physical" (Garage Mix) – 8:45
"More Than Physical" (Dub) – 4:58
"Scarlett" (Extended Version) – 5:20

UK 12-inch single (The Essential Ian Levine Dance Pack)
"More Than Physical" (Musclebound Mix) – 10:00
"Venus" (The Hellfire Mix) – 9:20
"Scarlett" – 4:11

US 12-inch single
"More Than Physical" (Garage Mix) – 8:45
"More Than Physical" (Dub) – 4:58
"More Than Physical" (7″ Mix) – 3:18

Charts

References

1986 singles
1986 songs
Bananarama songs
London Records singles
Song recordings produced by Stock Aitken Waterman
Songs written by Keren Woodward
Songs written by Sara Dallin
Songs written by Siobhan Fahey
Songs written by Matt Aitken
Songs written by Mike Stock (musician)
Songs written by Pete Waterman